Wetwang railway station was a railway station on the Malton & Driffield Railway in the East Riding of Yorkshire, England. It served the village of Wetwang, opened on 19 May 1853, and closed for passengers on 5 June 1950 and goods on 20 October 1958. For passenger traffic, Wetwang was the busiest station on the MDR.

References

Sources

External links
 Wetwang station on navigable 1947 O. S. map
Wetwang station at The Yorkshire Wolds Railway Restoration Project

Disused railway stations in the East Riding of Yorkshire
Former Malton and Driffield Junction Railway stations
Railway stations in Great Britain opened in 1853
Railway stations in Great Britain closed in 1950